The Northern Ireland Assembly Elections Act 2003 (c 3) is an Act of the Parliament of the United Kingdom. Its purpose was to postpone the election of the Northern Ireland Assembly.

Sections 1(2)(a) and 1(3) to 1(6) were repealed on 15 May 2003 by section 1(5) of the Northern Ireland Assembly (Elections and Periods of Suspension) Act 2003.

References

External links
The Northern Ireland Assembly Elections Act 2003, as amended from the National Archives.
The Northern Ireland Assembly Elections Act 2003, as originally enacted from the National Archives.
Explanatory notes to the Northern Ireland Assembly Elections Act 2003.

United Kingdom Acts of Parliament 2003